Alex J. Shook (born August 20, 1969) is a Democratic member of the West Virginia House of Delegates, representing the 44th District since 2006.

External links
West Virginia Legislature - Delegate Alex Shook official government website
Project Vote Smart - Representative Alex J. Shook (WV) profile
Follow the Money – Alex Shook
2008 2006 campaign contributions

Members of the West Virginia House of Delegates
1969 births
Living people